Khoja or Khwaja, a Persian word literally meaning 'master' or ‘lord’, was used in Central Asia as a title of the descendants of the noted Central Asian Naqshbandi Sufi teacher, Ahmad Kasani (1461–1542) or others in the Naqshbandi intellectual lineage prior to Baha al-din Naqshband.  The most powerful religious figure in the late Timurid era was the Naqshbandi Shaykh Khwaja Ahrar. The Khojas often were appointed as administrators by Mongol rulers in the Altishahr or present-day region of Tarim Basin in Xinjiang, China.

The Khojas of Altishahr claimed to be Sayyids (descendants of Muhammad) and they are still regarded as such by the fraternity people of Altishahr. Although Ahmad Kasani himself, known as Makhdūm-i-Azam or "Great Master" to his followers, never visited Altishahr (today's Tarim Basin), many of his descendants, known as Makhdūmzādas and bearing the title Khoja (properly written and pronounced Khwaja) played important parts in the region's politics from the 17th to 19th centuries.

On the death of Aḥmad Kāsānī, a division took place among the Khojas which resulted in one party becoming followers of the Makhdum's elder son Khoja Muhammad Amin better known as Ishan-i-Kalan and another attaching themselves to his younger son Khoja Muhammad Ishaq Wali. The followers of Ishan-i-Kalan seem to have acquired the name of Aq Taghliqs or White mountaineers and that of Ishaq Qara Taghliqs or Black mountaineers but these names had no reference to the localities where their adherents lived. All were inhabitants of the lowlands and cities of Eastern Turkistan but each section made allies among the Kyrgyz of the neighboring mountains and apparently subsidized them in their internecine battles. The Kyrgyz tribes of the Western Tian Shan ranges lying to the north of Kashghar were known as the White mountaineers and the Kyrgyz tribes of the Pamir, Karakoram and Kunlun as the Black mountaineers with Yarkand as their main city of influence, such that the Khojas came to assume the designations of their Kyrgyz allies.

The Chagatai language Tadhkirah i Khwajagan (a Tadhkirah) was written by M. Sadiq Kashghari.

List of Khojas
Note: The following list is incomplete and, at times, possibly slightly inaccurate. It also excludes several collateral lines that ruled over minor territories and were relatively unimportant.

Blue row signifies progenitor of the Khojas of Altishahr.
Green rows signify The Aq Taghliqs.
Pink rows signify the Qara Taghliqs.
Orange rows signify Chinese governors.

See also
 Jahangir Khoja
 Khwaja Ahmad Yasavi (a Sufi Shaykh who was held in high esteem among Central Asian Turkic peoples)
 Turkistan or Yasi, birthplace of Yasavi, in present-day Kazakhstan
 Khoja Nasreddin
 Dzungar conquest of Altishahr
 Āfāqī Khoja Holy War
 Fragrant Concubine

Literature
 Kim Hodong, "Holy War in China: The Muslim Rebellion and State in Chinese Central Asia, 1864–1877". Stanford University Press (March 2004). . (Searchable text available on Amazon.com)
 Gladney, Dru. "The Salafiyya Movement in Northwest China: Islamic Fundamentalism among the Muslim Chinese?" Originally published in "Muslim Diversity: Local Islam in Global Contexts". Leif Manger, Ed. Surrey: Curzon Press. Nordic Institute of Asian Studies, No 26. pp. 102–149.
 Ahmad Kasani in Encyclopædia Iranica (special fonts required to properly view)
 Azim Malikov, Kinship systems of Xoja groups in Southern Kazakhstan in Anthropology of the Middle East, Volume 12, Issue 2, Winter 2017, pр.78-91
 Azim Malikov, Sacred Lineages in Central Asia: Translocality and Identity in Mobilities, Boundaries, and Travelling Ideas: Rethinking Translocality Beyond Central Asia and the Caucasus edited by Manja Stephan-¬Emmrich and Philipp Schröder (Cambridge: Open Book Publishers), 2018, pp. 121–150
 Azim Malikov, Khoja in Kazakhstan: identity transformations in Max Planck Institute for Social Anthropology Department 'Integration and Conflict' Field Notes and research Projects VI CASCA – Centre for Anthropological Studies on Central Asia: Framing the Research, Initial Projects. Eds.: Günther Schlee. Halle/Saale, 2013, pp. 101–107

References

Islamic honorifics
Islam in China
History of Xinjiang